The Argun or Ergune (Ergene gol; , Ergüne mörön;  Yergenye,  Éěrgǔnà hé) is a  long river that forms part of the eastern China–Russia border, together with the Amur (Heilong Jiang). Its upper reaches are known as Hailar River in China.

Name 
The name derives from Buryat Urgengol 'wide river' (urgen 'wide' + gol 'river'). Mongolian word "ergün" (in Traditional Mongolian alphabet) or "örgön" (in modern Mongolian) means "wide".

Geography 
The river flows from the Western slope of the Greater Xing'an Range in China's Inner Mongolia, and forms the Chinese side of the two rivers that flow together to produce the Amur (Heilong). Its confluence with the Shilka at Ust-Strelka on the Russian side forms the Amur. Its main tributaries are the Urov, Uryumkan and Gazimur from the left, and the Gen He from the right.

Kherlen–Argun–Amur

History

In The Secret History of the Mongols is a legend related to the Ergüne hun  Mongol ancestry. In this legend, the Mongols prevailed over other tribes and carried such slaughter among them, that in living remained no more than two men and two women. These two families, in fear of the enemy, fled to the inhospitable terrain, which included only mountains and forests and to which there was no road. Among those mountains was the abundant grass and healthy climate of the steppe. Then, legend tells that in Ergune-Khun, Mongols multiplied and become masters of iron smelting and blacksmithing. According to legend, it is the art of melting iron that has helped them escape from the mountain gorges on scope of the current Mongolian steppes, to the Kherlen (Kelulun) and Onon River.

Prior to the emergence of the Mongols, the Amur River basin was home to certain tribes of Jurchen people, who founded the Jinn (1115–1234) dynasty in northern China. The Manchu people who founded the Qing dynasty (1644–1912) additionally claimed descent from the Jurchens. Following the Russian conquest of Siberia in the 17th century, Russia-China relations were formalized in the 1689 Treaty of Nerchinsk, which established the Argun River as the China–Russia border. However, prior to the Amur Annexation of Outer Manchurian territory, China's border extended further to include the so-called Sixty-Four Villages East of the River in present-day Amur Oblast, southern Khabarovsk, and all of Primorsky Krai. Although the subsequent Amur Annexation fixed the eastern Sino-Russian border at the Amur, it would only be at the 1991 Sino-Soviet Border Agreement when all Sino-Soviet border conflicts would be resolved.

References 

Rivers of Inner Mongolia
Rivers of Zabaykalsky Krai
Border rivers
China–Russia border
International rivers of Asia